Coach Carter (Music from the Motion Picture) is the soundtrack to Thomas Carter's 2005 film Coach Carter. It was released on January 11, 2005 through Capitol Records and composed of hip hop and R&B music. Production was handled by Needlz, Corner Boyz, French Spencer, Jason "Jay E" Epperson, Jubebox, Kanye West, Kwamé, Neek Rusher, The Trak Starz, Toxic, Van Hunt, Anthology, Andrew Slater, Mike Caren, with Andrew M. Shack and Darius Jones serving as executive producers.

Track listing 
These songs were not featured in the film's soundtrack:
 "Untouchable" by DMX (featuring Syleena Johnson, Cross, Infa-Red, Sheek Louch and Drag-On)
 "Comin' from Where I'm From" by Anthony Hamilton 
 "Get Low" by Lil' Jon & the East Side Boyz 
 "Let the Drummer Kick" by Citizen Cope

Personnel 
 Anthology – Producer
 Tom Baker – Mixing Assistant
 Leslie Brathwaite – Mixing
 Mike Caren – Producer, Engineer
 Thomas Carter – Executive Producer
 Corner Boyz – Producer, Engineer, Mixing
 Canela Cox – Vocals (background)
 Claudio Cueni – Engineer, Mixing, Pro-Tools
 Kevin "KD" Davis – Mixing
 DJ Judge Mental – Scratching
 Duro – Mixing
 Jason "Jay E" Epperson – Producer
 French – Programming, Multi Instruments, Producer, Engineer, Vocal Producer
 David Gale – Executive Producer
 Brian "Big Bass" Gardner – Mastering
 Brian Garten – Mixing
 Paul Gregory – Engineer
 Candyce Handley – Soundtrack Coordination
 Jennifer Hawks – Music Supervisor
 Jean-Marie Horvat – Mixing
 Van Hunt – Producer, Performer
 Darius Jones – Soundtrack Producer
 The Jukebox – Multi Instruments, Producer
 Kwamé "K1Mil" – Producer
 Bryan Loss – Engineer
 Keith Mangels – Guitar (Bass)
 Kevin Mangini – Executive in Charge of Music
 Manny Marroquin – Engineer, Mixing
 LaKiesha Miles – Vocals (background), Vocal Producer
 Carl Nappa – Mixing
 Needlz – Producer
 Rae Nimeh – Engineer
 Neil Pogue – Mixing
 James Porte – Mixing
 Brian Robbins – Executive Producer
 Neek Rusher – Producer
 Segal – Mixing
 Andrew M. Shack – Executive Producer, Soundtrack Producer
 Sham – Multi Instruments
 Skinny Ray – Engineer
 Andrew Slater – Vocal Producer
 Ryan Stoutenborough – Guitar
 Sharla Sumpter – Executive in Charge of Music
 Troy Taylor – Producer
 Jonna Terrasi – Soundtrack Coordination
 Van Toffler – Executive Producer
 Mike Tollin – Executive Producer
 Toxic – Producer
 The Trak Starz – Producer, Engineer
 Kanye West – Producer
 Howard Willing – Engineer
 Young Trey – Producer
 Zo – Multi Instruments

Charts

References

External links

Hip hop soundtracks
2005 soundtrack albums
Sports film soundtracks
Albums produced by Kwamé
Albums produced by Needlz
Capitol Records soundtracks
Albums produced by Kanye West
Biographical film soundtracks